Wimp is an unincorporated community in Tulare County, California, United States.

References

Unincorporated communities in Tulare County, California
Unincorporated communities in California